Ralf Koser (born 4 April 1973) is a German judoka. His sister Anja is a retired German first league team handball and soccer player.

Achievements

References

1973 births
Living people
German male judoka
20th-century German people